Across the Multiverse is the fourth studio album by American singer-songwriter Dent May. It was released in August 2017 under Carpark Records.

Track listing

References

2017 albums
Carpark Records albums
Dent May albums
Albums with cover art by Robert Beatty (artist)